Ivan Rowland Porter (8 September 1918 – 31 October 1990) was a former Australian rules footballer who played with Melbourne in the Victorian Football League (VFL).

Porter's football career was interrupted by his service in the Australian Army during World War II.

Notes

External links 

Ivan Porter's playing statistics from The VFA Project

1918 births
Australian rules footballers from Melbourne
Melbourne Football Club players
Prahran Football Club players
1990 deaths
People from Armadale, Victoria
Australian Army personnel of World War II
Military personnel from Melbourne